Stamora may refer to one of two places in Timiș County, Romania:

Stamora Germană, a village in Moravița Commune
Stamora Română, a village in Sacoșu Turcesc Commune